The Timeline of the Yemeni Crisis (2011–present) refers to events of the Houthi insurgency in Yemen, the Yemeni Revolution, the Al-Qaeda insurgency in Yemen and the South Yemen insurgency.

2011
 Timeline of the Yemeni Revolution (23 September – December 2011)
 Timeline of the Yemeni Revolution (3 June – 22 September 2011)
 Timeline of the Yemeni Revolution (January – 2 June 2011)

2012
 Timeline of the Yemeni Revolution (January – 27 February 2012)

2013
2013 mortal casualties, related with Ansar al-Sharia uprising 133-150+.
28 July-04 August – 17 Al-Qaeda suspects killed in drone attack.
September 20 attacks – 21 killed.
October 15 – 1 police officer killed in shootout.
October 17 – 1 soldier killed.
October 18 – 12 soldiers killed in suicide bombing.
December 5 – 52 killed in attack on defense ministry.

2014
During 2014 there were 317+ casualties in the Ansar al-Sharia insurgency, 654+ casualties in the Shia (Houthi) rebellion and 55+ killed in the South Yemen insurgency.

2015

On 15 February 2015, South Yemen separatists abducted 12 military officer in the area of Al-Habelin, Lahj.
On 16 February 2015, popular committees rebels raided the city of Zunjubar, Abyan governorate, expelling the local garrison of Special Security Forces. Government troops surrendered without offering any resistance.
Sana'a bombing took place on 20 March 2015, targeting Shi'a mosques in the capital of Yemen, killing over 120 people and wounding many more.

See also
List of drone strikes in Yemen

References

2010s in Yemen
Conflicts in 2022
Yemeni Crisis
Timelines of the Yemeni Revolution